<noinclude>
Badgoi (Badogai), also known as Badawi, is a mountain pass that connects Upper Dir District with Utror and Kalam in Khyber Pakhtunkhwa, Pakistan. The high mountain pass is elevated 3.523m above sea level. Badgoi Pass is the border of Kumrat Valley and Kalam Valley. This pass remains closed from November to the start of June due to snow.

References

Mountain passes of Khyber Pakhtunkhwa
Upper Dir District